Percy Butler may refer to:

 Percy M. Butler (1912–2015), British zoologist and paleontologist
 Percy Butler (American football) (born 2000), American football player